The Pentecostal Church in Poland is a Pentecostal Christian denomination in Poland. It is the largest Pentecostal denomination in Poland and a part of the World Assemblies of God Fellowship, and the second largest Protestant denomination in Poland. The Pentecostal Church in Poland is a member of Pentecostal European Fellowship and Biblical Society in Poland. Headquartered in the city of Warsaw.

History
The Pentecostal Church in Poland had its origins in the first bible college opened in 1929 by the Assemblies of God in the United States. The Church was forced join the United Evangelical Church of Poland during communism in 1947. The Pentecostal Church in Poland was founded in 1987.

It had 24,000 adherents and 240 congregations.

It has three Bible schools with extension programs training about 150 students and facilitates several ministries.

Administration
The church is divided into seven districts:
 Central District, covering the Łódź and Masovian Voivodeships
 Eastern District, covering the Lublin, Subcarpathian and Świętokrzyskie Voivodeships
 Northern District, covering the Podlaskie and Warmian-Masurian Voivodeships
 Pomeranian District, covering the Kuyavian-Pomeranian and Pomeranian Voivodeships
 Southern District, covering the Lesser Poland and Silesian Voivodeships
 Western District, covering the Lower Silesian and Opole Voivodeships
 Western-Greater Poland District, covering the Greater Poland, Lubusz and West Pomeranian Voivodeships

References

External links

  Official website of the Pentecostal Church in Poland

Christian denominations in Poland
Pentecostal denominations in Europe